Sphagnum recurvum is a species of moss belonging to the family Sphagnaceae.

It is native to Eurasia and America.

References

recurvum